Neptunes de Nantes (previously Nantes Atlantique Handball) is the name of a French handball club from Nantes. This team currently competes in the French Women's Handball First League from 2013.

Honours 
EHF European League:
Winner: 2021

Team

Current squad
Squad for the 2022–23 season.

Goalkeepers
 12  Floriane André
 24  Adrianna Płaczek
Wingers
RW
 4  Nathalie Hagman
 44  Raïssa Dapina
LW
 17  Marine Dupuis 
 42  Dyénaba Sylla
Line players
 5  Manon Loquay
 11  Oriane Ondono
 19  Anna Lagerquist

Back players
LB
 14  Mari Finstad Bergum
 33  Gordana Mitrović 
CB
 8  Carin Strömberg
 29  Léna Grandveau 
RB 
 13  Barbara Moretto
 20  Orlane Ahanda

Transfers
Transfers for the 2023–24 season 

 Joining
  Tamara Horacek (LB/CB) (from  Metz Handball) 
  Jessica Ryde (GK) (from  Ikast Håndbold) 
  Kelly Vollebregt (RW) (from  Odense Håndbold) 
  Helene Gigstad Fauske (CB) (from  Brest Bretagne Handball) 
  Océane Sercien-Ugolin (RB) (from  Vipers Kristiansand) 

 Leaving 
  Gordana Mitrović (LB) (to  OGC Nice Côte d'Azur Handball) 
  Adrianna Płaczek (GK) (to  Paris 92)
  Nathalie Hagman (RW) (to  SCM Râmnicu Vâlcea) 
  Raïssa Dapina (RW) (to  OGC Nice Côte d'Azur Handball) 
  Barbara Moretto (RB) (to  Paris 92)

Staff members
Staff for the 2022–23 season.
 Head coach: Helle Thomsen
 Training coach: Loreta Ivanauskaite

Notable players 

 Camille Ayglon-Saurina
 Blandine Dancette
 Pauline Coatanea
 Camille Aoustin
 Kalidiatou Niakaté
 Estelle Nze Minko
 Catherine Gabriel
 Alexandrina Cabral
 Elisabeth Chávez
 Beatriz Escribano
 Kaba Gassama
 Bruna de Paula
 Fabiana Diniz
 Elaine Gomes
 Sonja Bašić
 Dragica Džono
 Ivana Lovrić
 Lotte Grigel
 Stine Bodholt Nielsen
 Mia Møldrup
 Anette Helene Hansen
 Malin Holta
 Jovana Stoiljković
 Katarina Tomašević
 Esther Schop
 Isabelle Jongenelen
 Szabina Mayer
 Maroua Dhaouadi
 Isabell Klein

References

External links
 

French handball clubs
Sport in Nantes
1998 establishments in France
Handball clubs established in 1998